Henry Littlehales (26 August 1901 – 1989) was an English footballer who played as an inside forward for Reading, Tranmere Rovers and Wrexham. He made 173 appearances for Tranmere, scoring 52 goals.

Career statistics
Source:

References

1901 births
1989 deaths
Sportspeople from Burslem
Association football inside forwards
English footballers
Goldenhill Wanderers F.C. players
Rudyard F.C. players
Port Vale F.C. players
Reading F.C. players
Tranmere Rovers F.C. players
Wrexham A.F.C. players
English Football League players